Rika Dialina (born August 8, 1934) is a Greek actress and beauty queen. She represented Greece at the Miss Universe 1954 pageant in Long Beach, California.

Diallina, along with Miss Korea, Pu Rak Hi, were denied entry into the U.S. because of their alleged Communist affiliations. Dialina was disqualified from obtaining a U.S. visa for allegedly illustrating a book on Communism. In her place went first runner up, Effie Androulakakis, who won the Miss Friendship' award. U.S. Secretary of State John Foster Dulles intervened in Dialina's case and she was able to obtain a temporary entry permit. She arrived just a few days before the event, making the top 16 finalists.  Effie Androulakakis was asked to remain in the competition as Miss Crete but she declined, stating that Dialina was "the choice the people of my country to represent them here." Dialina got married while in the U.S. and remained in the country.

In 2002 her artwork was put on display at the Benedictine Art Awards, her work being one of the 40 to make the Park Avenue Art Gallery out of 2000 that participated in the event.

Filmography
Pontikaki, To 1954 ..... Christina
Kokkina triantafylla 1955
Diakopes stin Kolopetinitsa 1959 ..... Judy
Laos kai Kolonaki 1959 ..... Dedi
Na zisoun ta ftohopaida 1959 ..... Diana
Gia to psomi kai ton erota 1959 ..... Hilda
Enas vlakas kai misos 1959 ..... Ourania Karamaouna
Koroidaki tis despoinidos, To 1960 ..... Aliki
Randevou sti Venetia 1960
Spiti tis idonis, To 1961
Arhontas tou kampou, O 1961
Kalos mas angelos, O 1961
Tre volti della paura, I 1963 ..... Maria
Mostri, I 1963 ..... Anna
Gamos ala... ellinika 1964 ..... Mrs. Panagiotou
The Secret of Dr. Mabuse 1964 ..... Judy
Amore all'italiana 1965
Giulietta degli spiriti 1965 ..... woman in nightmare
Diplopennies 1966 ..... Rita
Io, io, io... e gli altri 1966
Xerokefalos, O 1970 ..... Sophie
Natane to 13, napefte se mas! 1970 ..... Lola
Taxitzou, I! 1970
Ethelontis ston erota 1971 ..... Tzina Karneli
Piso mou s' eho, satana! 1971
Agathiaris kai i atsida, O! 1971 ..... Mitsouko
Dromos ton iroon, O! 1971
Trellopenintaris, O 1971 ..... Mrs. Jefferson
Faflatas, O 1971 ..... Fofi
Ti 30... ti 40... ti 50... 1972 ..... Natalia
Efialtis, O 1978
Parthenokynigos, O 1980
Tyhodiohtes, Oi 1981
Kamakia, Ta 1981 ..... Nadia
Summer Lovers 1982 ..... Monica
Peraste... filiste... teleiosate! 1986
Ikoyenia pantrevomaste 1986
Bananes 1987
Orpheus & Eurydice 2000 ..... Shepherdess

References

External links
 

1931 births
20th-century Greek actresses
Actresses from Crete
Greek beauty pageant winners
Greek female models
Living people
Miss Universe 1954 contestants
Models from Crete
People from Heraklion
Greek expatriates in the United States
New York University alumni